Williamson Lake is a small mountain lake located below Welch Peak, near Chilliwack, British Columbia, Canada. It can be accessed by two different hiking trails, one 4 kilometers and the other 13 kilometers in length.

External links
ClubTread.com - Information about and photos of the hike to Williamson Lake
Trails.com - Information about the hike to Williamson Lake

Lakes of British Columbia
Yale Division Yale Land District